Albannach may refer to:

 Albannach (band), a Scottish band
 Albannach (album), a 2006 album by the Scottish band
 Admiralty, Trafalgar Square, pub in London which from 2005 to 2014 was a Scottish restaurant called Albannach